The 2011–12 Ugandan Super League was the 45th season of the official Ugandan football championship, the top-level football league of Uganda.

Overview
The 2011–12 Uganda Super League was contested by 15 teams and was won by Express FC, while Hoima-Busia and UTODA were relegated.

League standings

Leading goalscorer
The top goalscorer in the 2011-12 season was Robert Ssentongo of Uganda Revenue Authority SC with 13 goals.

Footnotes

External links
 Uganda - List of Champions - RSSSF (Hans Schöggl)
 Ugandan Football League Tables - League321.com
 Uganda Super League 2011/12 - Soccerway
 Uganda Super League 2011/12 - Futaa
 Uganda Super League 2011/12 - SoccerVista
 Uganda Super League 2011/12 - TablesLeague

Ugandan Super League seasons
Uganda Super League
Super League